The 45th Venice Biennale, held from June 13 to October 13, 1993, was an exhibition of international contemporary art, with 45 participating nations. The Venice Biennale takes place biennially in Venice, Italy. Prizewinners of the 45th Biennale included: ex aequo Richard Hamilton and Antoni Tàpies (Golden Lion for painting), Robert Willson (Golden Lion for sculpture), the German pavilion with Hans Haacke and Nam June Paik (best national representation), and Matthew Barney (Premio 2000 for young artists).

Awards 

 La Biennale di Venezia International Prizes:
Golden Lion for painting: ex aequo Richard Hamilton and Antoni Tàpies
Golden Lion for sculpture: Robert Wilson
 Golden Lion for best national representation: German Pavilion with Hans Haacke and Nam June Paik
 Premio 2000 (young artist; also called Duemila Prize): Matthew Barney
 Special awards (also called Honourable Mention): Louise Bourgeois, Ilya Kabakov, Joseph Kosuth, Jean Pierre Raynaud
 Premia Giulio Carlo Argan for the critics: David Sylvester
 Premia Gian Tomaso Liverani: Eva Marisaldi
 Premia (purchase) Fondazione Marino Marini: Luca Quartana
 Premia Swatch: Yukinori Yanagi

References

Bibliography

Further reading 

 
 
 

1993 in art
1993 in Italy
Venice Biennale exhibitions